Arveprinsen af Augustenborg, also referred to as Prinsen (Printzen) af Augustenborg, was an East Indiaman of the Danish Asiatic Company, constructed in Copenhagen in 1789. She completed nine expeditions to the East Indies between 1789 and 1805.

Construction and design
Arveprinsen af Augustenborg was constructed in 1789 by master shipbuilder Eskild Tønsberg. The construction took place either at the DAC's own shipyard at Asiatisk Plads or at nearby Bodenhoffs Plads. Her bilbrev was issued on 21 October 1789.

She was 117 feet long with a beam of 30 feet and a draught of 20 feet.

DAC service
Arveprinsen af Augustenborg completed nine expeditions to the East Indies. They took place in 1789, 1791, 1793, 1795, 1797, 1800, 1802, 1804 and 1807.  Her captains included M. I. Nørager (1789–1790). Peter Norden Sølling (30 May 1793) and Jens Holm (1795). Her complement was 71 men at the 1793 expedition.

Other ships by the same name

Arveprinsen af Augustenborg (1804–1805)
She was followed by two other ships by the same name. The first of these ships subject to major repairs undertaken by Børge Gabriel Lind at Copenhagen in 1804. She embarked on an expedition to either Canton or the East Indies under the command of captain Hans From in 1804.  She was severely damaged in a storm on the way back. She was subsequently sold by From on Mauritius (then Isle de France) and replaced by another ship by the same name.

Arveprinsen af Augustenborg (1805–1810)

The new ship was the French prize Hames Sibbold. She was later captured by the British but released with the assistance of Jens Wolff.

From February 1808, she was loaned out to the Royal Dano-Norwegian Navy. Her armament was 22 x 18-pounder guns and 16 x 8-pounder guns. She was captured by the British in 1719 and offered for sale in The Times on 23 April 1823  She was rebuilt and armed in 1825 at Curling, Young & Co shipyard at Limehouse. She was reclassed into corvette in 1828

References

External links
 Ship journals
 Spirse

Ships of the Danish Asiatic Company
Ships built in Copenhagen
1789 ships